Colin Clifft (born 16 October 1934), also known by the nickname of "Grandad", is an English former professional rugby league footballer who played in the 1950s and 1960s.

Background
Colin Clifft's birth was registered in Leeds North district, West Riding of Yorkshire, England. He is married to Beryl.

Playing career

International honours
Clifft won a cap for England while at Wakefield Trinity in 1956 against France.

County Cup Final appearances
Clifft played  in Featherstone Rovers' 0–10 defeat by Halifax in the 1963 Yorkshire County Cup Final during the 1963–64 season at Belle Vue, Wakefield on Saturday 2 November 1963.

Club career
Clifft made his début for Wakefield Trinity during March 1952, he played his last match for Wakefield Trinity during the 1956–57 season, he made his début for Featherstone Rovers on Saturday 28 November 1959, he appears to have scored no drop-goals (or field-goals as they are currently known in Australasia), but prior to the 1974–75 season all goals, whether; conversions, penalties, or drop-goals, scored 2-points, consequently prior to this date drop-goals were often not explicitly documented, therefore '0' drop-goals may indicate drop-goals not recorded, rather than no drop-goals scored.

References

1934 births
Living people
England national rugby league team players
English rugby league players
Featherstone Rovers players
Halifax R.L.F.C. players
Rugby league players from Leeds
Rugby league locks
Wakefield Trinity players